Is It the Sea? is a 2008 live album by Bonnie "Prince" Billy, featuring Harem Scarem and Alex Neilson. It was recorded at the Queen's Hall in Edinburgh during his sold out tour of Scotland and Ireland in the Spring of 2006, and includes songs of the then forthcoming album The Letting Go. Bonnie 'Prince' Billy was accompanied by Edinburgh’s Harem Scarem on close harmonies, fiddle, flute, banjo and accordion and Glasgow’s Alex Neilson on drums and percussion.

Track listing
 "Minor Place" 4:41
 "Love Comes to Me" 4:19
 "Bed Is for Sleeping" 3:52
 "Arise Therefore" 3:25
 "Wolf Among Wolves" 4:45
 "Ain't You Wealthy? Ain't You Wise?" 4:46
 "Cursed Sleep" 7:51
 "Molly Bawn" 7:33
 "Birch Ballad" 4:45
 "New Partner" 4:39
 "Is It the Sea?" 6:31
 "My Home Is the Sea" 7:30
 "Master and Everyone" 3:30

Vinyl-only unlisted bonus tracks
 "I See a Darkness" 6:32
 "Love in the Hot Afternoon" 4:43

References

External links
Is it the sea website @ Domino Records

2008 live albums
Will Oldham albums